Liam Conroy (born 17 July 1992) is a British professional boxer who challenged for the British light-heavyweight title in 2019.

Professional career 
Conroy made his professional debut on 22 June 2012, scoring a fourth-round technical knockout (TKO) victory over Danny Brown in a scheduled four round contest in the middleweight division. The fight was held at the De Veres White Hotel in Bolton, Lancashire.

Professional boxing record

References 

Living people
1992 births
Sportspeople from Cumbria
English male boxers
Light-heavyweight boxers